The Plymouth Whalers were a major junior ice hockey team in the Ontario Hockey League.  They played out of Compuware Arena in Plymouth, Michigan, USA, a suburb of Detroit until 2015 when they were relocated to Flint, Michigan.

History
The Whalers can trace their roots back to the 1990–91 Detroit Compuware Ambassadors as an expansion team in the OHL. Since then the franchise has also been called the Detroit Junior Red Wings and the Detroit Whalers. In 1997 they were officially called the "Plymouth Whalers" after the local municipality gave generous tax breaks to the team and venue. The franchise had been owned by Peter Karmanos since its inception until 2015.

The Whalers had been part of the Compuware Hockey program since 1990, which also includes the Compuware Ambassadors minor hockey program and the NHL's Carolina Hurricanes, who were formerly the Hartford Whalers, the namesake of the Detroit Whalers. The Carolina Hurricanes tended to give preference to players from the Plymouth Whalers in the NHL Entry Draft owing to common ownership (Karmanos owns both the Hurricanes and the OHL Whalers), and coaches and executives are promoted from within the Compuware Hockey affiliation. Chad LaRose is the only player to have played at every level of Compuware hockey; Compuware AAA Ambassadors, Plymouth Whalers, Florida Everblades, Lowell Lock Monsters, and the Carolina Hurricanes.

Plymouth is one of only two teams to win 5 consecutive division titles (West division from 1999 to 2003), the other team being the Ottawa 67's (East division from 1996 to 2000). Plymouth has made the playoffs 23 consecutive seasons, since the 1991–92 season.  The Whalers reached the OHL finals two consecutive seasons in 1999–2000, and 2000–01, losing to the Barrie Colts and Ottawa 67's. These seasons included future NHLers David Legwand, Justin Williams, Robert Esche, and Stephen Weiss.

Celebrating their 10th Anniversary playing at the Compuware Arena during the 2005–06 season, all current Whalers players had been brought into the system by head coach and general manager Mike Vellucci. This created the build-up for the next year.  Headed by overage captain John Vigilante, the team's rookies in 2003 and 2004 came to fruition in James Neal, Dan Collins, and Tommy Sestito. Vellucci acquired the Belleville Bulls' leading scorer Evan Brophey and the Toronto St. Michael's Majors goaltender Justin Peters, who had an extensive resume.  On the last game of the season, the Whalers played the Saginaw Spirit, with the division title on the line, in what has been proven to be one of the most exciting OHL games in recent history.  With the Whalers' 2–0 lead going into the third period, the Spirit fought back and managed the tying goal just before time expired.  However, Brophey scored in overtime to clinch the Whalers' 9th division title.

During the 2006–07 season, rookie goaltenders Jeremy Smith and Michal Neuvirth, combined for the lowest goals against average in the OHL, with only 173 goals against in total.  The Whalers had a number of high prospects signed or drafted by NHL teams, including former Wayne Gretzky 99 Award winner Daniel Ryder, who was acquired, with him already having been signed with the Calgary Flames.  After a very inconsistent start, the team improved to fall short of the London Knights by one point for the Hamilton Spectator Trophy.  During the second half of the season and through the playoffs, the Whalers featured a 23-game winning streak at home, lasting three and a half months, falling at Game 4 of the Western Conference Finals to London.  The Whalers, although seeded #2, easily won the Wayne Gretzky Trophy as Western Conference playoff champion, sweeping #7 Guelph, and winning in 5 against both #3 Kitchener and #1 London. In the final, the Whalers defeated the Sudbury Wolves in six games to win the J. Ross Robertson Cup, thus earning the right to represent the OHL in the 2007 Memorial Cup.

In the Memorial Cup, the team suffered a rough start, losing to the Vancouver Giants 4–3 in overtime on May 18, and again to the Medicine Hat Tigers 4–1 on May 21.  Their fortunes would change, however, on May 22, when they would defeat the Lewiston Maineiacs 2–1 in overtime, thus putting them in the tiebreaker game on May 24, in which they would defeat Lewiston again, 5–1,  eliminating the Maineiacs from the Memorial Cup and advancing to the semifinal. However, on May 25, the Whalers would lose again to the Vancouver Giants in the semifinal round, this time in dramatic fashion by a score of 8–1. This way, the Whalers finished the 2007 Memorial Cup in third place.

During the 2007–08 season, the Whalers dealt the goaltender that led them to their 2007 OHL Championship, Michal Neuvirth, early to make room for Jeremy Smith to start.  Neuvirth was among 12 players that left/were traded from that team, leaving the team looking to a number of young players for leadership.  Chris Terry led the team in scoring and was helped by overage captain Andrew Fournier and up-and-comer AJ Jenks.  In mid-December 2007, President and GM Mike Vellucci left his head coaching position for Greg Stefan.  A late season injury to overage defenseman Wes Cunningham hampered the flow of the team, leading to an early playoff exit at the hands of the eventual OHL champions, the Kitchener Rangers.

Early in the 2008–09 season, Stefan was recalled to the Hurricanes, where Mike Vellucci came back to fill the head coaching role.  Injuries and inconsistency plagued the team, as they fell to dead last in the league.  After the coaching change, as well as key trades, including a short lived experiment with Cory McGillis, then-leading scorer Matt Caria from the Greyhounds, Scott Fletcher from the Ice Dogs, and the return from AHL-playing Brett Bellemore, the team saw a turn around by Christmas putting them back into the middle of the pack.  At the deadline, as a result of Bellemore's return and the emergence of Matt Hackett as the new starting goaltender, Patrick Lee and Jeremy Smith were traded to Niagara for draft picks.

The 2009–10 season saw the Whalers led by league MVP Tyler Seguin along with other top scorers such as Myles McCauley.

On December 29, 2013, the Whalers and the London Knights broke the newly set Canadian Hockey League attendance record.  The Knights and Whalers, playing in the second OHL game of the evening outdoors at Comerica Park in Detroit, Michigan (also the second outdoor game ever played in the OHL), played in front of 26,384 spectators.  The Whalers won the game 2–1 in a shootout.

On January 14, 2015, owner Peter Karmanos announced that the Whalers would be relocated to Flint, Michigan after a sale of the team to the owner of Flint's Perani Arena and Event Center for the 2015–16 season. The OHL approved the sale, and the relocated franchise is named the Flint Firebirds. On March 21, the Plymouth Whalers played their final game in franchise history losing 5–1 to the Erie Otters.

Championships
The Plymouth Whalers have won eight divisional titles, five of them consecutively. Plymouth has also won three Hamilton Spectator trophies and reached the OHL Championship Finals three times, winning during the 2006–07 season.

J. Ross Robertson CupOHL Champion
1999–2000 Finalists vs. Barrie Colts
2000–01 Finalists vs. Ottawa 67's
2006–07 Champions vs. Sudbury Wolves

Wayne Gretzky TrophyWestern Conference Playoff Champion
1999–2000, 2000–01 and 2006–07

Hamilton Spectator TrophySeason Champion
1998–99 51 wins, 4 ties, 106 pts
1999–2000 45 wins, 4 ties, 1 OTL, 95 pts
2001–02 39 wins, 12 ties, 2 OTL, 92 pts

Bumbacco TrophyWest Division Champion
1998–99, 1999–2000, 2000–01, 2001–02, 2002–03, 2005–06, 2006–07, 2011–12, 2012-13

Coaches
1995–01 Peter DeBoer (6 seasons) - DeBoer was promoted from assistant coach to become coach & general manager of the Whalers organization in 1995. DeBoer was twice voted the OHL Coach of the Year, winning the Matt Leyden Trophy in the 1998–99 and 1999–2000 seasons.  DeBoer left to coach the Kitchener Rangers.
mid-2007-mid-2008 Greg Stefan (2 seasons) - Stefan began his coaching career in 1993 with the Detroit Junior Red Wings. He served as an assistant coach in Plymouth until 1998, and re-joined the Whalers as director of player development and assistant coach in 2003.  Named head coach during the 2007–08 season when Vellucci moved to focus on the front office, Stefan left the Whalers in the middle of the 2008–09 season to take a scouting job with the Carolina Hurricanes.
2001-mid-2007; mid-2008–pres Mike Vellucci (8th season) - Vellucci was promoted to President of the Plymouth Whalers in 2000 and was appointed the team's general manager and head coach in 2001. In 2007, Vellucci won the Matt Leyden Trophy as Ontario Hockey League Coach of the Year - the first American ever to win the award.  Vellucci stepped down in the middle of the 2007–08 season to focus on his GM position.  He returned as head coach of the club in the middle of the 2008–09 season with Stefan's moving to the Hurricanes.

Players

Retired numbers
14 - Pat Peake is the only number retired by the Whalers organization. Peake (who played in the Junior Red Wings era) was a two-season captain, the first MVP for the franchise in 1992–93, as well as Canadian Hockey League player of the year, and OHL Most Sportsmanlike player of the year.  He has the most career points in franchise history.

Team captains

1990–91 Paul Mitton
1991 Mark Lawrence (traded)
1991–93 Pat Peake
1993–95 Jamie Allison
1995–96 Bryan Berard
1996–97 Mike Morrone
1997–98 Andrew Taylor
1998–00 Randy Fitzgerald
2000–02 Jared Newman
2002–03 Nate Kiser
2003–04 James Wisniewski
2004–05 Tim Sestito (home) & John Mitchell (away & playoffs)
2005–06 John Vigilante
2006–07 Steve Ward
2007–08 Andrew Fournier (home & playoffs) & Chris Terry (away)
2008–09 Chris Terry
2009–10 AJ Jenks
2010–12 Beau Schmitz
2012–13 Colin MacDonald
2013–14 Nick Malysa
2014–present Alex Peters

Award winners
1997–98 - David Legwand: Canadian Hockey League Rookie of the Year, Emms Family Award OHL Rookie of the Year, Red Tilson Trophy Most Outstanding Player of the Year
1998–99 - Robert Holsinger & Rob Zepp: Dave Pinkney Trophy Lowest Team GAA
1998–99 - Rob Zepp: Canadian Hockey League Scholastic Player of the Year, Bobby Smith Trophy OHL Scholastic Player of the Year
1999–2000 - Rob Zepp and Bill Ruggiero: Dave Pinkney Trophy Lowest Team GAA
2000–01 - Rob Zepp and Paul Drew: Dave Pinkney Trophy Lowest Team GAA
2001–02 - Jason Bacashihua and Paul Drew: Dave Pinkney Trophy Lowest Team GAA
2001–02 - Jason Bacashihua: F.W. 'Dinty' Moore Trophy Best Rookie GAA
2002–03 - Chad LaRose: Leo Lalonde Memorial Trophy Overage Player of the Year
2002–03 - Paul Drew and Jeff Weber: Dave Pinkney Trophy Lowest Team GAA
2003–04 - James Wisniewski: Canadian Hockey League Defenceman of the Year, Max Kaminsky Trophy OHL Defenceman of the Year
2006–07 - Michal Neuvirth & Jeremy Smith: Dave Pinkney Trophy Lowest Team GAA
2006–07 - Michal Neuvirth: F.W. 'Dinty' Moore Trophy Best Rookie GAA
2008–09 - Chris Terry: Mickey Renaud Captain's Trophy Captain of the Year
2008–09 - Chris Terry: Dan Snyder Memorial Trophy OHL Humanitarian of the Year
2009–10 - Ryan Hayes: Dan Snyder Memorial Trophy OHL Humanitarian of the Year
2009–10 - Ryan Hayes: Canadian Hockey League Humanitarian of the Year
2009–10 - Tyler Seguin: Eddie Powers Memorial Trophy Most Points in the OHL
2009–10 - Tyler Seguin: Red Tilson Trophy OHL Most Outstanding Player of the Year
2009–10 - Tyler Seguin: Canadian Hockey League Top Prospect
2012-13 - Vincent Trocheck: Eddie Powers Memorial Trophy Most Points in the OHL
2012-13 - Alex Nedeljkovic: F.W. 'Dinty' Moore Trophy Best Rookie GAA
2013-14 - Alex Nedeljkovic: OHL Goaltender of the Year

Notable players

First round NHL Entry Draft picks
Players who were drafted in the first round of the NHL Entry Draft while playing for the Whalers franchise.
1991: Pat Peake, 14th Overall, Washington Capitals
1993: Todd Harvey, 9th Overall, Dallas Stars
1995: Bryan Berard, 1st Overall, Ottawa Senators
1998: David Legwand, 2nd Overall, Nashville Predators
2000: Justin Williams, 28th Overall, Philadelphia Flyers
2001: Stephen Weiss, 4th Overall, Florida Panthers
2010: Tyler Seguin, 2nd Overall, Boston Bruins
2011: Stefan Noesen, 21st Overall, Ottawa Senators
2011: Rickard Rakell, 30th Overall, Anaheim Ducks
2012: Tom Wilson, 16th Overall, Washington Capitals
2013: Ryan Hartman, 30th Overall, Chicago Blackhawks

Second round NHL Entry Draft picks
Players who were drafted in the second round of the NHL Entry Draft while playing for the Whalers franchise.
1993: Jamie Allison, 44th Overall, Calgary Flames
1995: Nic Beaudoin, 51st Overall, Colorado Avalanche
1997: Harold Druken, 36th Overall, Vancouver Canucks
2000: Tomas Kurka, 32nd Overall, Carolina Hurricanes
2000: Libor Ustrnul, 42nd Overall, Atlanta Thrashers
2000: Kris Vernarsky, 51st Overall, Toronto Maple Leafs
2003: David Liffiton, 63rd Overall, Colorado Avalanche
2005: James Neal, 33rd Overall, Dallas Stars
2007: Jeremy Smith, 54th Overall, Nashville Predators

NHL alumni
List of Plymouth Whalers alumni who have played in the National Hockey League.

Jamie Allison
Yuri Babenko
Jason Bacashihua
Brett Bellemore
Bryan Berard
Jared Boll
Jesse Boulerice
Fred Brathwaite
Evan Brophey
Kevin Brown
Eric Cairns
Gregory Campbell
Connor Carrick
Jamie Devane
Harold Druken
Robert Esche
Matt Hackett
Todd Harvey
Sean Haggerty
Cole Jarrett
Michal Jordan
Tomas Kurka
Chad LaRose
Mark Lawrence
David Legwand
David Liffiton
Paul Mara
Eric Manlow
Philip McRae
Sonny Milano
J. T. Miller
Mike Minard
John Mitchell
James Neal
Alex Nedeljkovic
Michal Neuvirth
Stefan Noesen
Pat Peake
Justin Peters
Rickard Rakell
Keith Redmond
Mike Rucinski
Tyler Seguin
Tim Sestito
Tom Sestito
Karl Stewart
Damian Surma
Chris Terry
Chris Thorburn
Vincent Trocheck
Nikos Tselios
Kris Vernarsky
Jason Ward
Scott Wedgewood
Stephen Weiss
Derek Wilkinson
Justin Williams
Tom Wilson
Chad Wiseman
James Wisniewski
Bob Wren
Rob Zepp

Yearly results

Regular season
Legend: OTL = Overtime loss, SL = Shootout loss

Playoffs

1997–98 - Defeated Sarnia Sting 4 games to 1 in division quarter-finals. Defeated Belleville Bulls 4 games to 2 in quarter-finals. Lost to Guelph Storm 4 games to 0 in semi-finals.
1998–99 - Defeated Windsor Spitfires 4 games to 0 in conference quarter-finals. Lost to London Knights 4 games to 3 in conference semi-finals.
1999–2000 - Defeated Guelph Storm 4 games to 2 in conference quarter-finals. Defeated Windsor Spitfires 4 games to 1 in conference semi-finals. Defeated Sault Ste. Marie Greyhounds 4 game to 1 in conference finals. Lost to Barrie Colts 4 games to 3 in finals.
2000–01 - Defeated Sarnia Sting 4 games to 0 in conference quarter-finals. Defeated Windsor Spitfires 4 games to 0 in conference semi-finals. Defeated Erie Otters 4 game to 1 in conference finals. Lost to Ottawa 67's 4 games to 2 in finals.
2001–02 - Lost to London Knights 4 games to 2 in conference quarter-finals.
2002–03 - Defeated Owen Sound Attack 4 games to 0 in conference quarter-finals. Defeated London Knights 4 games to 3 in conference semi-finals. Lost to Kitchener Rangers 4 games to 3 in conference finals.
2003–04 - Defeated Kitchener Rangers 4 games to 1 in conference quarter-finals. Lost to Guelph Storm 4 games to 0 in conference semi-finals.
2004–05 - Lost to Owen Sound Attack 4 games to 0 in conference quarter-finals.
2005–06 - Defeated Windsor Spitfires 4 games to 3 in conference quarter-finals. Lost to Guelph Storm 4 games to 2 in conference semi-finals
2006–07 - Defeated Guelph Storm 4 games to 0 in conference quarter-finals. Defeated Kitchener Rangers 4 games to 1 in conference semi-finals.  Defeated London Knights 4 games to 1 in conference finals. Defeated Sudbury Wolves 4 games to 2 in finals. OHL CHAMPIONSFinished tied for third place in Memorial Cup round-robin.Defeated Lewiston Maineiacs in tiebreaker round.Lost to Vancouver Giants in semi-finals.
2007–08 - Lost to Kitchener Rangers 4 games to 0 in conference quarter-finals.
2008–09 - Defeated Sarnia Sting 4 games to 1 in conference quarter-finals. Lost to Windsor Spitfires 4 games to 2 in conference semi-finals.
2009–10 - Defeated Sault Ste. Marie Greyhounds 4 games to 1 in conference quarter-finals. Lost to Windsor Spitfires 4 games to 0 in conference semi-finals.
2010–11 - Defeated Kitchener Rangers 4 games to 3 in conference quarter-finals. Lost to Owen Sound Attack 4 games to 0 in conference semi-finals.
2011–12 - Defeated Guelph Storm 4 games to 2 in conference quarter-finals. Lost to Kitchener Rangers 4 games to 3 in conference semi-finals.
2012–13 - Defeated Sarnia Sting 4 games to 0 in conference quarter-finals. Defeated Owen Sound Attack 4 games to 2 in conference semi-finals. Lost to London Knights 4 games to 1 in conference finals.
2013–14 - Lost to Guelph Storm 4 games to 1 in conference quarter-finals.
2014–15 - Out of playoffs.

Uniforms and logos

In 2009 all Canadian Hockey League teams came out with new Reebok EDGE Jerseys

The Plymouth Whaler logo features an angry hockey stick-wielding whale, blowing a puck and spout of water out its blow hole. The name Whalers is superimposed on the image surround by a circle of green and blue with waves in the background.

The Whalers white Jersey has the whaler logo in the center with 3 even stripes on the sleeves and bottom of the jersey. The stripes are evenly spaced with two navy outer lines and one green inner line.

The Whalers blue Jersey has the whaler logo in the center with a white space and green space going down the sleeves

Mascot

The Plymouth Whalers had a mascot named Shooter. His first game appearance was on December 11, 2003 against the Peterborough Petes.

Arena

Peter Karmanos arranged to build the Whalers a new home in Plymouth Township, Michigan as soon as the 1995–96 season ended. The Compuware Arena was constructed in six months' time, ready for the 1996–97 season, with a seating capacity of 3,807. In addition to the NHL-sized rink, there is an Olympic sized rink also in the building.

References

Ontario Hockey League teams
Ice hockey teams in Detroit
Amateur ice hockey teams in Michigan
Ice hockey clubs established in 1997
Ice hockey clubs disestablished in 2015
Sports in Plymouth Township, Michigan
1997 establishments in Michigan
2015 disestablishments in Michigan